Massa River may refer to:

Massa River (Morocco)
The Massa (river), a river in Switzerland.